Toby Gough is a British theatre director, writer, actor and teacher. He is known for devising multi-cultural adaptations of Shakespeare plays and creating international music theatre shows from Cuba, Ireland, India and Brazil.

He has won five Scotsman Fringe First Awards, two Herald Archangel awards, and two Jack Tinker Spirit of the Fringe lifetime achievement awards. The album he co-produced Small things fall from the Baobab Tree by the Zawose family of Tanzania was nominated for a Grammy Award.

Education 
Gough went to Charterhouse School, studied Meyerholdian Biomechanics with Gennady Bogdanov in Moscow 1989-1991, and holds an MA in English Literature from the University of Edinburgh 1989-1994.

Career 
Gough works in theatre as a writer, director, producer and actor. He has directed Kylie Minogue  in The Caribbean Tempest in The Holders Festival in Barbados. During the Bosnian war, he entered Sarajevo under siege through a sewage tunnel to co-direct the opera Evropa with the Sarajevo Philharmonic Orchestra and the Palcici children's choir.

After the 2004 tsunami in Sri Lanka, Gough created Children of the Sea with child survivors of the disaster which toured to refugee camps across the island and went on to win the first prize at the Edinburgh Festival Fringe.

As a writer and director Gough has created the international touring productions of Linnaeus Prince of Flowers, Brazil! Brazil!, Lady Salsa, and others.

Gough has served as a visiting lecturer and theatre practitioner leading workshops in Participatory Theatre for Conflict Transformation, and Devising Theatre in universities and drama schools in the UK and around the world. As a theatre practitioner, he has led educational workshops in eastern and central Africa.

See also 
 The Merchants of Bollywood
 Riverside Studios
 Light Years (Kylie Minogue album)
 Vaibhavi Merchant
 Brooke Satchwell
 Denzil Smith

References

British theatre directors
British writers
British actors
Year of birth missing (living people)
Living people